The men's 4 x 100 metres relay at the 2002 European Athletics Championships were held at the Olympic Stadium on August 10–11.

Medalists

Note: Great Britain team originally won the gold but was later disqualified for Dwain Chambers' steroid use.

Results

Heats
Qualification: First 3 of each heat (Q) and the next 2 fastest (q) qualified for the final.

Final

External links

Relay
Relays at the European Athletics Championships